Iniistius jacksonensis, the purple-spotted wrasse, is a species of marine ray-finned fish 
from the family Labridae, the wrasses. It is found in the Eastern Indian Ocean.  

References

jacksonensis
Taxa named by Edward Pierson Ramsay
Fish described in 1881